DCI/DI Sam Tyler is a fictional character in BBC One's science fiction/police procedural drama, Life on Mars.

Life on Mars

2006

The character of Sam Tyler is the main protagonist within the programme. During the first episode, Tyler is hit by a car in 2006 and wakes up in 1973, finding himself working in the same police station and location as he did in 2006, albeit as a DI (Detective Inspector) rather than his 2006 rank of DCI (Detective Chief Inspector).

Throughout both series, it remains unclear to both the audience and character whether he is mad or in a coma or has actually travelled back in time.

1973

Upon waking in 1973, Tyler finds himself working at the same station he is based at in 2006, under a "rough-around-the-edges" boss, DCI Gene Hunt (Philip Glenister). During the two series, Tyler frequently clashes with Hunt regarding their different policing methods. Tyler, being a 21st-century detective, is forensically aware and procedurally correct, whereas Hunt values violence, corruption and gut instinct in order to catch criminals. In the end, the two develop a love-hate relationship and respect each other's input.

Throughout the series, Tyler frequently hears and sees things from his life in 2006. While in 1973, Tyler often sees images from the present day on his television, hears loved ones and medical staff talk about him and to him through phones and portable radios, along with being stalked by Test Card Girl (Rafaella Hutchinson and Harriet Rogers) and experiencing recurring hallucinations.

Tyler becomes good friends with Annie Cartwright (Liz White) and she is the only character in the programme to whom he reveals his true situation. Tyler also becomes friends with Chris Skelton (Marshall Lancaster) who attempts to learn from Tyler's modern policing methods, and is introduced to tape-recording interviews by Tyler, something which was not standard procedure in the 1970s. However, Tyler often clashes with Ray Carling (Dean Andrews), as he views Tyler as stopping him from being promoted to Detective Inspector.

While in 1973, Tyler finds himself investigating many crimes with the CID team from serial killers, armed robberies, murders, a hostage situation and a suspicious death in police custody.

During episode four and episode eight, Tyler meets his mother  Ruth (Joanne Froggatt) and his father, Vic (Lee Ingleby). Despite thinking that persuading his father to stay with his mother might enable him to return to 2006, this plan is revealed to be unsuccessful.

Finale

During the series finale, a new character is introduced: Acting DCI Frank Morgan (Ralph Brown) to temporarily oversee CID after Gene Hunt is wrongly suspected of murder. Tyler is convinced that Morgan is his surgeon, attempting to revive him from his coma. However, Morgan reveals that Tyler is DCI Sam Williams of C-Division at Hyde and a part of M.A.R.S. (Metropolitan Accountability and Reconciliation Strategy), a taskforce to deal with corruption in the police force. He also reveals that "Williams" was sent undercover with a fake identity, DI Sam Tyler, to infiltrate Hunt's team, but developed severe concussion and amnesia after a bad car accident on the way. After finding evidence to substantiate Morgan's claims, a distraught Tyler begins to doubt if he is actually from the future.

Morgan convinces Tyler that exposing Gene Hunt and his CID team while on an undercover operation to catch a violent armed robber, Leslie Johns (Sean Gilder), will enable him to return to the future. While the undercover operation is in progress on the train that Leslie Johns and his team is attempting to rob, Chris, Gene, Ray and Annie all come under fire and are caught out in the open. Tyler rushes to Frank Morgan who is observing the situation from inside the train tunnel and asks for his promised armed assistance. Morgan refuses and tells Tyler that they are to let Hunt and the rest of CID die in the fire-fight, as it is the perfect way to expose Hunt. After talking to Morgan and working out that the way to wake up from his coma is to leave the team to die, Tyler wakes up in 2007.

Upon recovering, he becomes a shell of his former self, remaining emotionally scarred and haunted by the promise he made to Annie in 1973, to return and save her from the fire-fight on the train. We see him back in the clinical, bureaucratic, modern world of policing. After alienating his cold, unsympathetic colleagues and confiding to his elderly mother, he commits suicide by joyfully taking a running jump off the police station roof.

Tyler re-appears in the railway tunnel in 1973 and promptly kills Leslie Johns, saving the team's lives as he promised. After being thanked by the team and kissing Annie, Tyler receives a message on Gene's car radio from 2007 that he is "slipping away", implying that he has chosen to stay in 1973. This time, Tyler finds the strength to turn the radio off and rides off into the sunset with Hunt and the rest of the team.

Series creators Ashley Pharoah and Matthew Graham have confirmed that they intended Sam's jump to be suicide. In an interview with the Manchester Evening News, Graham states that Sam is now in the afterlife, where time lasts an eternity compared to the suicide's duration of a few seconds: "The truth is, when I wrote it, what I was trying to say is that he's died, and that for however long that last second of life is going to be, it will stretch out for an age, as an eternity for him. And so when he drives off in that car, he's really driving off into the afterlife."

Life after 1973

During Life on Mars''' spin-off, Ashes to Ashes set in 1981, it is revealed that Sam Tyler lived for a further seven years. Tyler later married Annie Cartwright and died in 1980 after unintentionally driving his car into a river while in pursuit of a suspect, from which his body was never recovered. Jackie Queen described Sam and Annie as the "happiest couple" she had ever seen and that Tyler was the "most loved man she had ever met."

During the first episode of series three of Ashes to Ashes, the nature of his death is raised when Alex Drake discovers a witness statement implied to have been written by Gene Hunt with various parts blacked out, accompanied by Alex seeing visions of a man with injuries to the left side of his face dressed in police tunic and greatcoat. In the second episode, DCI Jim Keats, an officer from the Discipline and Complaints department, intent on removing Gene Hunt, states he believes Gene killed Sam Tyler. In the fifth episode, Gene destroys Tyler's clothes (which Alex had requested from Manchester) and the censored file in order to prevent her from learning the truth about his death. In the following episode, a suspect who is not only a known fantasist but appears very different physically from Sam tries to convince Alex that he is Sam Tyler after undergoing extensive plastic surgery, and that he is from the future. He quotes Sam's usual speech in the Life on Mars introductions, claiming that nobody else is real, although he still seems to be pleased when he, Gene and Alex are in the same room, calling them the 'Three Musketeers', and avoiding Alex's attempts to test him for future knowledge by claiming that such details are forgotten after too long in the past. Gene tells Alex that he helped Sam fake his own death, meaning Sam was still alive but had disappeared into thin air.

During the penultimate episode of series three, after being asked by Alex Drake if Hunt murdered Tyler, Hunt explains how after a few weeks of Tyler acting "weird" he helped him fake his own death as Tyler "had to go". In the finale, it is revealed that some years later, Sam Tyler had taken Gene's offer of going "to the pub"—accepting his death in the real world, and moving on from his life in the past.

 Characteristics 

Personality and appearance

Tyler is displayed to be a professional and procedurally correct officer who dislikes corruption and brutality, with a strong moral centre and sense of justice. An example of this is found in episode four when, after discovering that the entire CID are being bribed to help a local crime boss, he tries to end the arrangement. He has a serious nature at odds with his colleagues, made worse by the stress of his 'delusions' and 'hallucinations' he experiences that reference his coma in the future. He often openly challenges Hunt when working, so Hunt often perceives him as an arrogant know-it-all. He does not show much of a sense of humour when working, usually displaying surprise or disgust at Hunt's off-colour remarks. He is initially very open to Annie about his 'delusions', but gradually stops mentioning these as he spends more time in the past.

For the majority of his time in 1973, Tyler wears a black leather jacket with jeans or plain trousers and typical shoes of the day, with his collar spread out and no tie, unlike the rest of Hunt's CID. During his brief showing in 2006, he wears a formal dark navy suit with a tie. Tyler also wears a St. Christopher pendant, reflecting his time traveller status, St. Christopher being the patron saint of travellers. He also wears a Casio gold watch, which has both analogue and digital display. This could be a deliberate anachronism (as this model was not on the market until well after 1973) either to connect him with his 21st-century self, or as a red herring to the clue-spotters. He has dark brown eyes and short brown hair.

Relationships

Tyler's main relationship throughout both series is with Annie Cartwright, who is the only character he fully enlightens to his situation.

Tyler and Chris Skelton eventually become friends, with Chris seeing him as a role model and learning from his modern policing techniques, such as tape recording interviews and forensic awareness. However, Chris finds himself torn between Tyler's methods and Hunt's.  Chris later states in Ashes to Ashes that he's not sure if they were friends and that Sam was "more of a mentor, really".

Throughout the two series, Ray Carling and Tyler often clash. According to the series website, this is because Ray was seen as the "golden boy" and had applied for promotion before Tyler arrived as the new Detective Inspector. Carling frequently insults Tyler and disobeys his orders, and has an extreme loyalty to Hunt which is often a source of conflict. According to the series website, they also clash because Carling is a similar character to Hunt.

Despite the love-hate relationship and constant disagreements Tyler and Hunt suffer, they eventually come to respect each other, with Hunt respecting Tyler due to his tireless and methodical investigation techniques and, while not agreeing with all his methods, Tyler respecting Hunt's ability to get results. The creators have stated that this is because Hunt "sees a lot of Tyler" in himself. They both appear to trust each other as in the seventh episode of series two, Hunt calls Tyler first after he wakes up having appeared to have killed a man while Tyler appears to be the only officer who believes that Hunt is innocent and eventually he is proven right.

During the first episode of Ashes to Ashes, Carling's attitude towards Tyler appeared to have softened. Carling acknowledged Tyler's bravery in saving his colleagues during the last episode of Life on Mars, but he still criticises his tendency to disobey Hunt.

In another Ashes to Ashes'' episode Chris Skelton operates the receiver for a wireless bug, boasting that he had been taught about such things by "the great Sam Tyler himself."
.

References

External links
 Sam Tyler (Life on Mars)
 Sam Tyler (Internet Movie Database)

Fictional people from Manchester
Fictional British police detectives
Fictional New York City Police Department detectives
Life on Mars (TV series) characters
Television characters introduced in 2006